The Ministry of Investment is a ministry of the Government of South Sudan. The incumbent minister is Dr Dhieu Mathok.

List of Ministers of Trade, Industry and East Africa Community Affairs

See also
Ministry of Trade, Industry and East Africa Community Affairs (South Sudan)

References

Trade, Industry and East Africa Community Affairs
South Sudan, Trade, Industry and East Africa Community Affairs
South Sudan
2011 establishments in South Sudan
South Sudan

Investment